Gangamma Jatara or Jathra is a folk festival celebrated in several places across Southern India; including Karnataka, Rayalaseema and Andhra regions in Andhra Pradesh. It is celebrated for eight days.

It is also celebrated by fishermen before the start of fishing in Andhra region.

See also
Bonalu
Tirupati Ganga Jatara

References

External links
 Fishing community in Visakhapatnam worships Goddess of Water for good catch

Festivals in Andhra Pradesh